Everett is an unincorporated community in Cass County, in the U.S. state of Missouri.

History
Everett was platted in 1867, and named in honor of politician Edward Everett. A post office called Everett was established in 1857, and remained in operation until 1906.

References

Unincorporated communities in Cass County, Missouri
1867 establishments in Missouri
Unincorporated communities in Missouri